The men's pole vault at the 2022 World Athletics U20 Championships was held at the Estadio Olímpico Pascual Guerrero on 2 and 4 August.

Records
U20 standing records prior to the 2022 World Athletics U20 Championships were as follows:

Results

Qualification
The qualification round took place on 2 August, in two groups, both starting at 9:00 Athletes attaining a mark of at least 5.35 metres ( Q ) or at least the 12 best performers ( q ) qualified for the final.

Final
The final was held on 4 August at 15:07.

References

pole vault
Pole vault at the World Athletics U20 Championships